The women's 100 metre freestyle event at the 2012 Summer Olympics took place on 1–2 August 2012 at the London Aquatics Centre in London, United Kingdom.

Dutch swimmer Ranomi Kromowidjojo swam to a new Olympic record to become the country's third gold medalist in the event, along with Rie Mastenbroek in 1936 and Inge de Bruijn in 2000. In fourth place at the halfway turn, she pulled ahead of a tightly-packed field to touch the wall first and improve her own record in 53.00. Belarus' Aliaksandra Herasimenia was in the lead on the first length under a world-record pace, but faded down the stretch to win the silver medal in 53.38. China's Tang Yi swam a fast final lap for the bronze medal in 53.44.

Australia's Melanie Schlanger finished fourth in 53.47, while American teenage sensation Missy Franklin finished in fifth place in 53.64. Great Britain's home favorite Francesca Halsall (53.66), Denmark's Jeanette Ottesen (53.75), who shared the title with Herasimenia at the 2011 World Championships, and U.S. swimmer Jessica Hardy (54.02) finished in sixth thru eighth place.

Before the breakthrough finale, Kromowidjojo swam a top-seeded time of 53.05 to slice 0.07 seconds off the previous Olympic record set by Germany's defending champion Britta Steffen, who later missed the final roster with a twelfth-place finish (54.18) in the semifinals.

Only 48 of the 50 swimmers registered in the event competed. Sweden's five-time Olympian Therese Alshammar suffered a pinched nerve in her neck, and skipped most of her events. Australia's Cate Campbell scratched her first individual race because of a glandular fever.

Records
Prior to this competition, the existing world and Olympic records were:

The following records were established during the competition:

Results

Heats

Semifinals

Semifinal 1

Semifinal 2

Final

References

External links
NBC Olympics Coverage

Women's 00100 metre freestyle
2012 in women's swimming
Women's events at the 2012 Summer Olympics